Feathers are epidermal growths which form an outer covering on birds and some dinosaurs.

Feather may also refer to:

Arts, entertainment, and media

Films and television
 Feathers (film), a 1987 Australian film
 The Feather, a 1929 British romantic drama film
 "The Feather", an episode of Touched by an Angel
"Feathers", a character from the 1959 film Rio Bravo

Literature 
Feathers (novel), a 2007 children's novel by Jacqueline Woodson
 Feathers (play), a play by Eliza Power
Feathers: The Evolution of a Natural Miracle, a 2011 non-fiction book by conservation biologist Thor Hanson

Music 
 Feather (step), a dance step in Foxtrot
 The Feather (award), an award within the Dutch music industry
 Feathers (American band), an electronic music band
 Feathers (Australian band), a four-piece band
The Featherz, a Welsh/English alternative rock band
Feather (musical artist), American electronic dance music producer
Feathers aka Turquoise, a folk music/mime trio formed by David Bowie in late 1968 
feather (album), a 2003 album by Misako Odani
Feathers (Dead Meadow album), 2005
 Feathers, a Buckethead album
"Feathers", a 2008 single by progressive rock band Coheed and Cambria

Computing and technology 
Feather, an incision in diamonds affecting diamond clarity
Feather, the NATO reporting name of the Yakovlev Yak-17 fighter aircraft
Feather, the minimum drag position of a rowing oar or an aircraft propeller, see feathering

Other uses
Feathered hair, a hairstyle which was a fashion in the 1970s
Feathering (horse), properly called "Feather" on some breeds, long hair growing over the lower leg and fetlocks of horses

People with the surname 
Leonard Feather (1914–1994), jazz writer and producer
Lorraine Feather (born 1948), lyricist/songwriter, and the daughter of Leonard Feather
Vic Feather (1908–1976), former General Secretary of the Trade Union Congress in Great Britain, 1969–1973
Mr. Feathery, nickname of Lennard Freeman (born 1995), American basketball player in the Israeli Basketball Premier League

See also 
Feathering (disambiguation)
Feathers Hotel (disambiguation)